Agricultural land is typically land devoted to agriculture, the systematic and controlled use of other forms of lifeparticularly the rearing of livestock and production of cropsto produce food for humans. It is generally synonymous with both farmland or cropland, as well as pasture or rangeland.

 arable land (also known as cropland): here redefined to refer to land producing crops requiring annual replanting or fallowland or pasture used for such crops within any five-year period
 permanent cropland: land producing crops which do not require annual replanting
 permanent pastures: natural or artificial grasslands and shrublands able to be used for grazing livestock
This sense of "agricultural land" thus includes a great deal of land not devoted to agricultural use. The land actually under annually-replanted crops in any given year is instead said to constitute  or  "Permanent cropland" includes forested plantations used to harvest coffee, rubber, or fruit but not tree farms or proper forests used for wood or timber. Land able to be used for farming is called . Farmland, meanwhile, is used variously in reference to all agricultural land, to all cultivable land, or just to the newly restricted sense of "arable land". Depending upon its use of artificial irrigation, the FAO's "agricultural land" may be divided into irrigated and non-irrigated land.

In the context of zoning, agricultural land or agriculturally-zoned land refers to plots that are permitted to be used for agricultural activities, without regard to its present use or even suitability. In some areas, agricultural land is protected so that it can be farmed without any threat of development. The Agricultural Land Reserve in British Columbia in Canada, for instance, requires approval from its Agricultural Land Commission before its lands can be removed or subdivided.

Area

Under the FAO's definitions above, agricultural land covers 38.4% of the world's land area as of 2011. Permanent pastures are 68.4% of all agricultural land (26.3% of global land area), arable land (row crops) is 28.4% of all agricultural land (10.9% of global land area), and permanent crops (e.g. vineyards and orchards) are 3.1% (1.2% of global land area).
 Total of land used to produce food: 
 Arable land: 
 Permanent pastures: 
 Permanent crops: 

Globally, the total amount of permanent pasture according to the FAO has been in decline since 1998, in part due to a decrease of wool production in favor of synthetic fibers (such as polyester) and cotton.

The decrease of permanent pasture, however, does not account for gross conversion (e.g. land extensively cleared for agriculture in some areas, while converted from agriculture to other uses elsewhere) and more detailed analyses have demonstrated this. For example, Lark et al. 2015 found that in the United States cropland increased by 2.98 million acres from 2008 to 2012 (comprising  converted to agriculture, and  converted from agriculture).

Source: Helgi Library, World Bank, FAOSTAT

Agricultural land market

Prices and rents for agricultural land depend on supply and demand.

Prices/rents rise when the supply of farmland on the market reduces. Landholders then put more land on the market – causing prices to fall. Conversely, land prices/rents fall when the demand for agricultural land declines because of falls in the returns from holding and using it.  The immediate triggers for falls in land demand might be reductions in the demand for farm produce or in relevant government subsidies and tax reliefs.

Russia 
The cost of Russian farmland is as little as €1,500–2,000 (£1,260–1,680) per hectare (ha) (£1,260–1,680). This is comparatively inexpensive. Poor-quality farmland in France and Spain is sold at no lower than €10,000/ha.

The average Russian farm measures 150 hectares (370 acres). The most prevalent crops in Russia are wheat, barley, corn, rice, sugar beet, soy beans, sunflower, potatoes and vegetables. Russian farmers harvested roughly 85–90 million tonnes of wheat annually in the years around 2010.  Russia exported most to Egypt, Turkey and Iran in 2012; China was a significant export market as well. The average yield from the Krasnodar region was between 4 and 5 tonnes per ha, while the Russian average was only 2t/ha.  The Basic Element Group, a conglomerate owned by Oleg Deripaska, is one of Russia's leading agricultural producers, and owns or manages 109,000ha of Russian farmland, out of 90m actual and 115m total (0.12% actual).

Ukraine 
In 2013, Ukraine was ranked third in corn production and sixth in wheat production.  It was the main supplier of corn, wheat, and rape to Europe, although it is unclear whether the internal supply from countries like France were accounted in this calculation.  Ukrainian farmers achieve 60% of the output per unit area of their North American competitors.  UkrLandFarming PLC produces, from 650,000 hectares (1.6m acres), corn, wheat, barley, sugar beet, and sunflowers. Until 2014, the chief Ukrainian export terminal was the Crimean port of Sevastopol.

United States 
Prime farmland in Illinois is valued, as of August 2018, at $26,000 a hectare. Average cropland value in the Midwest according to 2020 data from the US Department of Agriculture is $4,607 per acre (about $11,000 per hectare).

See also
English land law
Farmer
Land grabbing

References

External links